Anna Woltz (born 29 December 1981) is a Dutch writer of children's literature.

Early life 

Woltz was born in 1981 in London, United Kingdom. Her father is Wout Woltz who was the editor-in-chief of NRC Handelsblad between 1983 and 1989.

Career 

In 2006, Woltz co-authored the book Post uit de oorlog with her father based on his experiences during World War II.

In 2015, Woltz received the Nienke van Hichtum-prijs for her children's book Honderd uur nacht (2014), a story inspired by Woltz's time in New York City when Hurricane Sandy struck the city. A year later, Woltz received the Gouden Griffel award for her book Gips (2015). Woltz also received the Zilveren Griffel award in 2016 for Gips and in 2017 she received the same award for her book Alaska.

Her book Mijn bijzonder rare week met Tess (2013) was awarded the Thea Beckmanprijs and adapted to film by Steven Wouterlood. The film adaptation, internationally titled My Extraordinary Summer with Tess, won the Grand Prize Feature Film Award at the New York International Children's Film Festival in 2019. The film also won awards at the Berlin International Film Festival and the KinoKino International Film Festival. In July 2019, it was shortlisted as one of the nine films in contention to be the Dutch entry for the Academy Award for Best International Feature Film at the 92nd Academy Awards but it was not selected.

In 2022, her book De tunnel was nominated for the Flemish literary award Boon in the category children's literature.

Woltz was also the author of Haaientanden, the Kinderboekenweekgeschenk published during the Kinderboekenweek of 2019.

Personal life 

She studied history in Leiden, Netherlands.

Awards 

 2012: Thea Beckmanprijs, Ik kan nog steeds niet vliegen
 2015: Nienke van Hichtum-prijs, Honderd uur nacht
 2016: Gouden Griffel, Gips
 2016: Kleine Cervantes, Honderd uur nacht
 2017: Zilveren Griffel, Alaska

References

External links 

 
 Anna Woltz (in Dutch), Digital Library for Dutch Literature

1981 births
Living people
20th-century Dutch women writers
21st-century Dutch women writers
Nienke van Hichtum Prize winners
Gouden Griffel winners